Neustadt am Rennsteig is a village and a former municipality in the district Ilm-Kreis, in Thuringia, Germany. Since 1 January 2019, it is part of the town Großbreitenbach. Its history can be traced back to the 15th century. Due to its location at 805 metres above sea level, there is scarcely another Thuringian locality located this high.

References

Former municipalities in Thuringia
Ilm-Kreis